Moolachel, or Moolachy, is a village in the Kanniyakumari District on the southern tip of India in the state of Tamil Nadu. It is located near Padmanabhapuram Palace, with a few nearby town centres: Thuckalay, Marthandam, and Nagercoil.

The population is primarily employed in agriculture. However, recent improvements in education have helped residents to diversify their economic opportunities and emigrate to different countries. This place is famous for scenic views of sunrises and sunsets and it's a good place for site-seeing for visitors. 

The village is home to a CSI church (CSI Hacker Memorial Church), which runs a creche and a matriculation school, though people of many religions live there. A government high school and TNEB SubStation/Office are also found in Moolachel. 

A channel runs across the village with a 1.5-meter-wide gate to drain water at Kollankonam during the flood season.

The Glaring Sports Club facilitates the playing of kabbadi, volleyball, and various cultural activities. The club was founded by Mr. Paul D Silas, and other 20 people in the 1986.

The people of Moolachel are famous for making agricultural products such as bananas, coconuts, Ayurvedic medicine plants, vegetables, rubber, peper and (in ancient years) karrupukatti.

Important areas in the village are Christu Nager, Manali, Kannankarai Vilai, Kattuvilai, pantivettan parai, Valanvilai and kollankonam, poovan vilai, Keezha Moolachel etc. Moolachel is near Padmanabhapuram Palace. Historically, Moolachel was famous for Silambam, Kaliai and vermakalai.

External links
 Google Earth Location

Kanyakumari
Villages in Kanyakumari district